Ivan Nikolaevich Popov (known in Duma as Popov 4th, ; 1878, Vologda Governorate — after 1912) was a peasant, merchant and deputy of the Third Imperial Duma from the Vologda Governorate between 1907 and 1912. He was elected as non-partisan, but in Duma he adjoined the Moderate-right faction; later he left the faction and became non-partisan again. He was a member of the commercial and industrial commission, as well as the commission on resettlement (see Stolypin reform).

Literature 
 Попов Иван Николаевич (in Russian) // Государственная дума Российской империи: 1906—1917 / Б. Ю. Иванов, А. А. Комзолова, И. С. Ряховская. — Москва: РОССПЭН, 2008. — P. 483. — 735 p. — .
 Попов (in Russian) // Члены Государственной думы (портреты и биографии): Четвертый созыв, 1912—1917 г. / сост. М. М. Боиович. — Москва: Тип. Т-ва И. Д. Сытина, 1913. — P. 38. — LXIV, 454, [2] p. 

1878 births
Date of death missing
Members of the 3rd State Duma of the Russian Empire
People from Nikolsky Uyezd
People from Nikolsky District, Vologda Oblast
Merchants from the Russian Empire